Vasilis Georgiadis (12 August 1921 – 30 April 2000) was a Greek film director and actor. His films The Red Lanterns (1963) and Blood on the Land (1966) were nominated for the Academy Award for Best Foreign Language Film.

Selected filmography
 Aces of the Stadiums (1956)
 Diakopes stin Kolopetinitsa (1959)
 Periplanomenos Ioudaios (1959)
 Krystallo (1959)
 Flogera kai Aima (1961)
 Min Erotevesai to Savvato (1962)
 Orgi (1962)
 I Katara tis Manas (1962)
 The Red Lanterns (1963)
 Gamos Ala Ellinika (1964)
 Blood on the Land (1966)
 I Evdomi Mera tis Dimiourgias (1966)
 Girls in the Sun (1968)
 One Night for Love (1968)
 Agapi gia Panta (1969)
 O Mplofatzis (1969)
 The Battle of Crete (1970)
 Ekeino to kalokairi (1971)
 Synomosia sti Mesogeio (1975)

References

External links

1921 births
2000 deaths
Greek film directors
Greek male film actors
People from Gelibolu
20th-century Greek male actors
Emigrants from the Ottoman Empire to Greece